A research fellow is an academic research position at a university or a similar research institution, usually for academic staff or faculty members. A research fellow may act either as an independent investigator or under the supervision of a principal investigator. 

Although research fellow positions vary in different countries and academic institutions, it is in general that they are junior researchers who try to develop their research careers under the guidance of senior researchers.

India

In India, the position of research fellowship is provided to scholars from various streams like science, arts, literature, management and others. Research fellowship is funded by government academic and research institutes, and private companies as well. Research fellows research under the supervision of experienced faculty, professor, head of department, Dean on two different posts known as Junior Research Fellowship (JRF) and senior research fellow (SRF). Research organisations like ICAR, CSIR, UGC, ICMR, SERB recruit research fellows through National Eligibility Test. After the completion of pre-defined tenure, JRF can be considered for senior research fellowship based on research fellow's performance & interview conducted by committee by research institute, research fellow is working with. There are multiple academic institutions that conduct research based Fellow Programmes in India. Some of these institutions include Institute of Management Technology, Ghaziabad, Indian Institute of Management Calcutta, Indian Institute of Management Shillong, Indian School of Business Mohali, National School of Leadership Pune and XLRI - Xavier School of Management Jamshedpur,Kunwar Viyogi Memorial Trust Uttar Pradesh.

Russian Federation

This position normally requires a degree of Candidate of Sciences approximately corresponding to the PhD. More senior positions normally require, in addition to the aforementioned degree, a track record of publications or certified inventions, as well as practical contributions to major research and development projects.

South Africa

Research fellows in South Africa are considered an asset to research organisations and universities. There are highly ranked universities such as University of the Witwatersrand, University of Stellenbosch Business School, and Rhodes University which offer fellowships to South African nationals in certain fields of research.

United Kingdom

In many universities this position is a career grade of a Research Career Pathway, following on from a postdoctoral position such as research associate, and may be open-ended, subject to normal probation regulations. Within such a path, the next two higher career grades are usually senior research fellow and professorial fellow. Although similar to the position of a research fellow, these two positions are research only posts, with the rise of the career grade there will normally be a formal requirement of a moderate amount of teaching and/or supervision (often at postgraduate level).

In some universities, research career grades roughly correspond to the grades of the academic pathway in the following way: research fellow (a lower or same grade as a lecturer), principal research fellow—reader, whereas senior research fellow is somewhere between a lecturer and senior lecturer or associate professor. Some universities such as Cambridge restricts Professorial grades only to academics who have excelled in both teaching and research.

Outside of faculty appointments, the title of "Research Fellow" or "Senior Research Fellows" can be also used as honorary or temporary awarded "fellowships" to distinguished academics by research institutes or colleges, usually from different institutions.

In the past, the term research fellow often referred to a junior researcher, who worked on a specific project on a temporary basis. Research fellows tended to be paid either from central university funds or by an outside organisation such as a charity or company, or through an external grant-awarding body such as a research council or a royal society, for example in the Royal Society University Research Fellowship. Particularly in Oxbridge style colleges, research fellows appointed as fellows of a college tended to, or still do, partially receive remuneration in form of college housing and subsistence. Colleges may award junior research fellowships as the equivalent of post-doctoral research posts, lasting for three or four years.

See also
 Fellow
 Lecturer
 List of academic ranks
 Research assistant
 Research associate

References 

Academic administration
fellow